Petr Koukal (born 14 December 1985) is a Czech professional badminton player.

Biography
Koukal started playing badminton in 1993, at a club owned by his father in Hořovice, and made his debut in the international tournament in 2000. In 2003 he was selected to join the national team, and at the same year, he won the mixed doubles title at the national championships partnered with Markéta Koudelková. Until 2016, he has collected 9 national titles, where 8 of them won in the men's singles event. Koukal first competed at the Summer Olympics in Beijing.

In 2010, Koukal was diagnosed with testicular cancer and underwent a successful therapy. He was awarded 2011 Fair Play Award, in Brno, Czech Republic. In July 2012, Czech Olympic Committee announced selection of Koukal for flag bearer of Czech team at the 2012 Summer Olympics in London, citing him as an example of sport role in recovery from a grave illness and of return to competition at top level.

In 2016, Petr Koukal was awarded as the secondary recipient of the Hanno R. Ellenbogen Citizenship Award for his commitment and help to men with testicular cancer through his foundation. In May 2016, Czech biathlete Gabriela Soukalová became his spouse; they divorced in late 2020. He made his third appearance at the Summer Olympics through the Tripartite Commission Invitation.

Achievements

BWF Grand Prix 
The BWF Grand Prix has two levels: Grand Prix and Grand Prix Gold. It is a series of badminton tournaments, sanctioned by the Badminton World Federation (BWF) since 2007.

Men's Singles

 BWF Grand Prix Gold tournament
 BWF Grand Prix tournament

BWF International Challenge/Series
Men's Singles

Mixed Doubles

 BWF International Challenge tournament
 BWF International Series tournament

Other
2006 - Spanish International: Men's singles (quarter final)
2006 - Austrian International: Men's singles (quarter final)
2006 - Austrian International: Mixed doubles (quarter final)
2005 - Hungarian International: Men's singles (semi final)
2005 - Babolat Slovak International: Men's singles (semi final)
2005 - Babolat Slovak International: Mixed doubles (semi final)
2003 - Slovenia International: Mixed doubles (quarter final)
2003 - Slovak International: Mixed doubles (quarter final)
2003 - Czech International: Mixed doubles (quarter final)
2003 - Sofiisk Imoti JSC Bulgarian International: Mixed doubles (semi final)
2002 - Slovak International: Mixed doubles (quarter final)

References

External links
Personal Website
BWF player profile

1985 births
Living people
People from Hořovice
Czech male badminton players
Badminton players at the 2008 Summer Olympics
Badminton players at the 2012 Summer Olympics
Badminton players at the 2016 Summer Olympics
Olympic badminton players of the Czech Republic
Badminton players at the 2015 European Games
European Games competitors for the Czech Republic
Sportspeople from the Central Bohemian Region